Hafiz Faizal (born 23 September 1994) is an Indonesian badminton player who is affiliated with the Jaya Raya Jakarta badminton club.

Achievements

BWF World Tour (1 title, 2 runners-up) 
The BWF World Tour, which was announced on 19 March 2017 and implemented in 2018, is a series of elite badminton tournaments sanctioned by the Badminton World Federation (BWF). The BWF World Tour is divided into levels of World Tour Finals, Super 1000, Super 750, Super 500, Super 300, and the BWF Tour Super 100.

Mixed doubles

BWF International Challenge/Series (3 titles, 3 runners-up) 
Mixed doubles

  BWF International Challenge tournament
  BWF International Series tournament

BWF Junior International (4 titles, 1 runner-up) 

Boys' doubles

Mixed doubles

  BWF Junior International Grand Prix tournament
  BWF Junior International Challenge tournament
  BWF Junior International Series tournament
  BWF Junior Future Series tournament

Performance timeline

National team 
 Junior level

 Senior level

Individual competitions

Junior level  
 Boys' doubles

 Mixed ' doubles

Senior level

Men's doubles

Mixed doubles

Record against selected opponents 
Record against year-end Finals finalists, World Championships semi-finalists, and Olympic quarter-finalists.

  Lu Kai & Huang Yaqiong 1–0
  Muhammad Rijal & Vita Marissa 0–2
  Praveen Jordan & Debby Susanto '''0–1

References 

1994 births
Living people
Sportspeople from Jakarta
Indonesian male badminton players
Competitors at the 2017 Southeast Asian Games
Southeast Asian Games gold medalists for Indonesia
Southeast Asian Games medalists in badminton